Schefflera alpina is a flowering plant in the family Araliaceae. It is endemic to Vietnam.

References

alpina
Flora of Vietnam